Alexander Parkhomenko, is a 1942 Soviet adventure film directed by Leonid Lukov.

Plot 
The film tells the story of the life of Alexander Parkhomenko, the commander who served in times of civil war, which goes to Tsaritsyn and there, leading the "Red" battalions, forcing the enemy to leave the city.

The portrayal of the actual participation of the Red army in Ukraine is questionable, as "the Red Army had never engaged the Germans, except for some minor skirmishes, let alone defeated them."

Cinema and Soviet Society From the Revolution to the Death of Stalin. Peter Kenez. New York: I.B. Taurus. 2006 P.181

Cast 
 Aleksandr Khvylya as Aleksandr Parkhomenko (as A. Khvylya)
 Nikolay Bogolyubov as Voroshilov (as N. Bogolyubov)
 Pyotr Aleynikov as Gaivoron (as P. Aleynikov)
 Vera Shershnyova 
 Stepan Kayukov as Lamychev (as S. Kayukov)
 Tatiana Okunevskaya as (as T. Okunevskaya)
 Boris Chirkov as Makhno (as B. Chirkov)
 Vasiliy Zaychikov as Kolokolov (as Vasili Zajchikov)
 Semyon Goldshtab as Josef Stalin
 Ivan Novoseltsev 	
 Yuri Lavrov as Anarchist (as Yu. Lavrov)
 Boris Andreyev as Anarchist (as B. Andreyev)
 Faina Ranevskaya
 Vladimir Osvetsimsky as Colonel (uncredited)

References

External links 
 

1942 films
1940s Russian-language films
Soviet black-and-white films
Soviet adventure films
1942 adventure films
Cultural depictions of Nestor Makhno
Cultural depictions of Joseph Stalin